Wolf's Lair Abyss is an EP by the Norwegian black metal band Mayhem.

According to the band's website, it is the first part of Grand Declaration of War. The main riff of the last track, "Symbols of Bloodswords", is used in "A Grand Declaration of War" and "View from Nihil (Part II)".

This EP was the first Mayhem release without guitarist Euronymous, who was murdered in 1993. The new line-up's material displayed across the songs is notably far more technical than that of earlier incarnations of the band; apart from the intro, each track contains at least two separate sections and is played at high tempo with consistent blast beats.

Track listing

Personnel
Mayhem
Sven Erik Kristiansen (Maniac) - vocals
Rune Eriksen (Blasphemer) - guitar
Jørn Stubberud (Necrobutcher) - bass guitar
Jan Axel Blomberg (Hellhammer) - drums

Production
Produced by Krystoffer Rygg
Engineered, mixed and mastered by Mayhem
Recorded at Studio Studio Nyhagen

See also
 Mayhem discography

References

Mayhem (band) albums
1997 EPs
Black metal EPs